Bounlap Khenkitisack (born 18 June 1966) is a Laotian professional footballer and  football manager. He played for Yotha F.C. From October 2004, to 2005, and from January to February 2011 he coached the Laos national football team.

International goals

Manager

Lao Toyota
 Lao Premier League  Champions (1); 2017
Young Elephant F.C
 Pepsi Lao League 1
 Champions (1); 2021

References

External links
Profile at Soccerway.com
Profile at Soccerpunter.com

1966 births
Living people
Laotian footballers
Yotha F.C. players
Laotian football managers
Laos national football team managers
Place of birth missing (living people)
Association footballers not categorized by position